Khaled Bouzama (born 13 January 1988) is an Algerian footballer who plays for MC El Eulma as a defender.

References

External links

1988 births
Living people
Association football defenders
Algerian footballers
MC El Eulma players
21st-century Algerian people